The Mysterious West is a 1994 anthology edited by Tony Hillerman and published by HarperTorch (an imprint of HarperCollins). The book went on to win the Anthony Award for Best Short Story Collection in 1995.

Development of anthology
Hillerman selected twenty short mystery stories about the American West, by twenty different Western authors. The stories are set in a variety of locations, from Berkeley, California and Las Vegas, Nevada to the Alaskan bush.

List of story titles and authors
 Forbidden Things by Marcia Muller
 New Moon and Rattlesnakes by Wendy Hornsby
 Coyote Peyote by Carole Nelson Douglas
 Nooses Give by Dana Stabenow
 Who Killed Cock Rogers? by Bill Crider
 Caring for Uncle Henry by Robert Campbell
 Death of a Snowbird by J.A. Jance
 With Flowers in Her Hair by M.D. Lake
 The Lost Boys by William J. Reynolds
 Tule Fog by Karen Kijewski
 The River Mouth by Lia Matera
 No Better Than Her Father by Linda Grant
 Dust Devil by Rex Burns
 A Woman's Place by D.R. Meredith
 Postage Due by Susan Dunlap
 The Beast in the Woods by Ed Gorman
 Blowout in Little Man Flats by Stuart M. Kaminsky
 Small Town Murder by Harold Adams
 Bingo by John Lutz
 Engines by Bill Pronzini

Reviews

Kirkus Reviews was disappointed that there was not more written by Tony Hillerman, the editor of this collection of short stories, than the introduction to each story. They did identify the best of the short stories as, "Marcia Muller's bittersweet memoir of a young woman's abortive homecoming, Linda Grant's reunion of a daughter with her eccentric, threatened father, Susan Dunlap's deadpan account of a loony hostage-taking in Berkeley, Ed Gorman's spare, chilling tale of a boy whose father is maddened by a run of bad luck -- typically subordinate atmosphere to the exploration of (generally troubled) family ties." And they noted the "least successful -- the undernourished whodunits by Dana Stabenow, Bill Crider, and Rex Burns, the postcard landscapes of Karen Kijewski and Bill Pronzini -- seem swallowed up by their settings; and the main interest of the tales by Carole Nelson Douglas and Stuart M. Kaminsky is to watch their tenderfoot creators pick their way gamely through the sagebrush." The concept of the regional viewpoint was considered novel.

Library Journal recommended this book and another anthology of stories by Western writers for library collections, for the different perspective of each book. One is Talking Up a Storm: Voices of the New West by Gregory L. Morris of Pennsylvania State University, who interviewed Western authors who were "all "postmodernist" and "postregionalist" in their perspectives", and who offer "insights into what direction the new Western literary tradition seems to be headed." The other is The Mysterious West, a less weighty book, with "20 short stories, primarily mystery and detective fiction", each introduced by Tony Hillerman. In sum, the 20 stories had "fictional landscapes here [that] range from the desolation, silence, and danger of Death Valley, and the small, dying towns of southern Colorado to the sophisticated originality and zaniness of Berkekey, California." The two books together introduce a reader to Western literature.

Publication history
This anthology was first released in hardcover in 1994. A paperback edition was released in 1995, using a different cover.

References

External links
 The Mysterious West at The Tony Hillerman Portal at UNM Library

Anthony Award-winning works
American mystery novels
1994 American novels